The 1996 La Flèche Wallonne was the 60th edition of La Flèche Wallonne cycle race and was held on 17 April 1996. The race started in Spa and finished in Huy. The race was won by Lance Armstrong of the Motorola team.

General classification

References

1996 in road cycling
1996
1996 in Belgian sport